Ken Stewart or Stuart may refer to:

 Ken Stewart (politician), politician from British Columbia, Canada
 Ken Stewart (ice hockey) (1912–2002), Canadian professional ice hockey player
 Ken Stewart (rugby union) (born 1953), New Zealand rugby union player
 Ken Stewart (rugby league), Australian rugby league player
 Kenneth Stewart (1925–1996), British Labour MEP
 Kenneth Stewart (RNZAF officer), New Zealand flying ace
 Ken Stuart, American microbiologist
 Kenneth Stuart (1891–1945), Canadian soldier
 Ken Stuart (tennis), American tennis player